Pavel Nikolaev is a Russian sprint canoeist. At the 2012 Summer Olympics, he competed in the Men's K-1 1000 metres.

References

Russian male canoeists
Living people
Olympic canoeists of Russia
Canoeists at the 2012 Summer Olympics
1984 births
Sportspeople from Moscow
Financial University under the Government of the Russian Federation alumni